Chengbei is a town of Jiange County in northeastern Sichuan province, China, located  south of the county seat. , it has 17 villages under its administration.

See also 
 List of township-level divisions of Sichuan

References 

Towns in Sichuan
Jiange County